Umuganda is a national holiday in Rwanda taking place on the last Saturday of every month for mandatory nationwide community work from 08:00 to 11:00. Participation in umuganda is required by law, and failure to participate can result in a fine. The program was most recently re-established in 2009, and has resulted in a notable improvement in the cleanliness of Rwanda.

Etymology
Umuganda means "coming together in common purpose" in Kinyarwanda, the official language of Rwanda. In the 1970s, however, the term was synonymous with forced labour.

History

In the 20th century, Rwandans were recorded as being required to work for their community leader twice a week, while the Belgians encouraged "umuganda" as a way of life. In the run-up to the Rwandan genocide, weekly umuganda meetings were successfully used by Hutu elites to mobilise Hutu civilians for genocide. As part of Rwanda's reconstruction efforts after the genocide, President Paul Kagame mandated that every last Saturday of the month would be known as "umunsi w’umuganda" or "contribution made by the community", during which all traffic would be stopped for three hours in the morning in order for Rwandans to clean up the war-torn capital. Umuganda as it exists presently was instituted in 2009.  Inspired by the success of Umuganda in Rwanda, the Mayor of Johannesburg Herman Mashaba introduced a volunteer cleanup programme called A Re Sebetseng in August 2017. The United Nations Mission in South Sudan (UNMISS) instituted a similar program in South Sudan in June 2019.

Enforcement and effectiveness
All Rwandans aged 18 to 65, bar those unfit to participate, are legally required to take part in Umuganda civil conscription scheme; non-compliance may result in a fine of 5,000 francs or $6. Umuganda has led to a considerable improvement in the cleanliness of Rwanda.

References

Society of Rwanda
Rwandan culture